László Dajka (born 29 April 1959 in Nyíregyháza) is a former Hungarian football player.

European Champions' Cup 
In the season 1980–81, he participated into the European Champions' Cup with Budapest Honved where they reached the second round of the competition where they were beaten by Real Madrid by a 3-0 aggregate scoreline.

He participated in the 1986 World Cup, which turned out a major disaster for Hungarian football – mainly because of the 0–6 defeat against the Soviet Union – and for Dajka in particular, having scored an own goal in the particular match.

He was particularly well known for headers, scoring a great number of his goals that way.

He has lately coached several Hungarian teams.

Honours 
Hungarian League: 1980, 1984, 1985, 1986, 1988 
Hungarian Cup: 1985

References 

NB I 
Zea. A & Haisma. M. 2008. European Champions' Cup 1980-81 - Details
Magyar Version of Wikipedia

External links 
Haisma. M. 2004. UEFA Intertoto Cup 2004 - Details
UEFA. 2002. Survival not enough for Dajka
UEFA. 2004. All Change in Hungary
UEFA. 2005. Football Europe: Katan answers West Ham Call
Budapest Honved FC. Bajnokok Valogatottak
Balafon FC official Website. 2004. Results of the championship 2003-2004
members.tripod.com

1959 births
Living people
People from Nyíregyháza
Hungarian footballers
Association football midfielders
Hungary international footballers
1986 FIFA World Cup players
Budapest Honvéd FC players
UD Las Palmas players
La Liga players
Segunda División players
Yverdon-Sport FC players
Kecskeméti TE players
Hungarian expatriate footballers
Expatriate footballers in Spain
Expatriate footballers in Switzerland
Hungarian expatriate sportspeople in Spain
Hungarian expatriate sportspeople in Switzerland
Hungarian football managers
Budapesti VSC managers
Kecskeméti TE managers
Szombathelyi Haladás football managers
BKV Előre SE managers
Békéscsaba 1912 Előre managers
Debreceni VSC managers
FC Sopron managers
Zalaegerszegi TE managers
Dabas FC managers
FC Tatabánya managers
Soroksár SC managers
Kisvárda FC managers
Nemzeti Bajnokság I managers
Sportspeople from Szabolcs-Szatmár-Bereg County